The UK Rock & Metal Albums Chart is a record chart which ranks the best-selling rock and heavy metal albums in the United Kingdom. Compiled and published by the Official Charts Company, the data is based on each album's weekly physical sales, digital downloads and streams. In 2009, there were 23 albums that topped the 52 published charts. The first number-one album of the year was Chinese Democracy by Guns N' Roses, which reached the top of the chart for the week ending 6 December 2008 and remained at number one for six consecutive weeks. The final number-one album of the year was the Foo Fighters compilation album Greatest Hits, which first topped the chart for two weeks beginning in the week ending 14 November and returned for a four-week run at the end of the year.

The most successful album on the UK Rock & Metal Albums Chart in 2009 was Green Day's eighth studio album 21st Century Breakdown, which spent a total of eleven weeks at number one over five separate runs during the year. Nickelback's fifth studio album All the Right Reasons and Greatest Hits by Foo Fighters each spent six weeks at number one during 2009, while Muse's fifth studio album The Resistance was number one for a total of five weeks. The Resistance was also the best-selling rock and metal album of the year in the UK, ranking 25th in the UK End of Year Albums Chart. Appetite for Destruction by Guns N' Roses was number one for three weeks in 2009, while Chinese Democracy, Kerrang! The Album '09 and Paramore's Brand New Eyes each spent two weeks at number one.

Chart history

See also
2009 in British music
List of UK Rock & Metal Singles Chart number ones of 2009

References

External links
Official UK Rock & Metal Albums Chart Top 40 at the Official Charts Company
The Official UK Top 40 Rock Albums at BBC Radio 1

2009 in British music
United Kingdom Rock and Metal Albums
2009